Yareli Guadalupe Carrillo Salas (born July 3, 1989) is a Mexican model and beauty pageant titleholder who represented her state in the Miss Earth Mexico 2014 pageant. She won the title of Miss Mexico Earth 2014 at the pageant's final competition on September 4, 2014.

Yareli represented Mexico in the Miss Earth 2014 beauty pageant, which was held on November 29, 2014 in Quezon City, Philippines, where she made it as a Top 16 semifinalist.

2 years after, she competed for the state title of Nuestra Belleza Sinaloa 2016 finished as Suplente/1st Runner-up.

References

External links

1989 births
Living people
Mexican beauty pageant winners
Miss Earth 2014 contestants
Mexican female models